The 2020 Drive for the Cure 250 presented by Blue Cross Blue Shield of North Carolina was the 29th stock car race of the 2020 NASCAR Xfinity Series, the 48th iteration of the event, the third race of the playoffs, and the final, and therefore cutoff race for the Round of 12. The race took place on Saturday, October 10, 2020 in Concord, North Carolina at the Charlotte Motor Speedway roval, a permanent  road course, using part of the oval and part of the infield road course. The race was extended from 67 to 68 laps due to NASCAR overtime finish. A. J. Allmendinger would survive the race, avoiding crashing in the rain and a charging Noah Gragson to win the race. Noah Gragson of JR Motorsports and Daniel Hemric of JR Motorsports would finish 2nd and 3rd, respectively.

The race is known for the heavy rain that fell down on the track that day, leading to several spins and wrecks. Numerous cars were spinning during 7 laps to go in Stage 1, starting with Kyle Weatherman. Eventually, the rain would get so bad that the leader spun from the lead, multiple drivers ended up in the tire barriers (Tommy Joe Martins, Matt Mills, Austin Hill), and a red flag was thrown. While rain did still fall down, the race was continued and finished in the same day it was started. However, many drivers would still spin out or worse.

Background

Entry list

Starting lineup 
Qualifying was set by a formula set on the previous race. As a result, Noah Gragson of JR Motorsports was given the pole.

Race

Pre-race ceremonies

Race recap

Post-race driver comments

Race results 
Stage 1 Laps: 20 

Stage 2 Laps: 20

Stage 3 Laps: 28

References 

2020 NASCAR Xfinity Series
NASCAR races at Charlotte Motor Speedway
October 2020 sports events in the United States
2020 in sports in North Carolina